Escadron d'Hélicoptères 1/44 Solenzara is a French Air and Space Force squadron located at Solenzara Air Base, Haute-Corse, France which operates the Aérospatiale SA 330 Puma.

The 'Solenzara' helicopter squadron was created in Novembre 1988 under the designation EH 06.067, but the presence of hélicoptèrs at Base aérienne 126 dates much further back, to 1964.

See also
 List of French Air and Space Force aircraft squadrons

References

French Air and Space Force squadrons
Helicopter units and formations
Military units and formations established in 1988